Charles Paul Trippy III (born September 2, 1984) is an American musician, vlogger and internet personality based in St. Petersburg, Florida. He is a member of Bradenton-based rock band We the Kings. Trippy recorded his first album with We the Kings, titled Somewhere Somehow in 2013. The album peaked at no. 44 on Billboard 200. He is also the creator of Internet Killed Television, a web series aired on YouTube. Trippy is the current holder of the Guinness world record for the Longest running video blog series with 3,653 videos, and for this reason was featured on Ripley's Believe It Or Not!.

Early life and education 
Trippy was born to Charles Paul 'Chaz' Trippy II and Marlene Trippy, in 1984, in Bradenton, Florida. He is of Sicilian Italian, German, and Native American descent. His father was a member of the Gregg Allman Band where he played percussion. As a youngster, Trippy often toured with his father's band. His younger sister, Melissa Trippy, is also an internet personality.

Trippy attended Lakewood Ranch High School where he completed his early education. Later, he attended and graduated from the University of South Florida where he majored in communications.

Career

As a YouTuber 
Trippy started his YouTube channel CTFxC in 2008, although the daily vlogs only started on May 1, 2009. Initially, Trippy planned to do daily video blogs for one year, however, he continued to create videos daily after completing the first year. As of 2020, Trippy's daily vlogs is in its 11th year. Calling his daily vlogging series Internet Killed Television, it chronicles his daily life with his wife Allie Marie Trippy (born Wesenberg) and their pets, friends and family. The series formerly featured Trippy's ex-wife, Allison Speed who would vlog with him for almost six years before they separated in 2014.

In 2015, Trippy was featured in Ripley's Believe It or Not! publication. He was also featured in the documentary film Vlogumentary which was developed by Shay Carl in 2016. Trippy holds the Guinness World Record for the Longest Running video blog series on YouTube by the number of episodes which goes alongside his record for the Most consecutive daily personal video blogs posted on YouTube. With 3,653 vlogs from May 1, 2009, to May 1, 2019, Trippy holds these records since May 1, 2019.

By September 2020, Trippy's YouTube channel had received around 798 million views with 1.4 million subscribers. The channel has been covered by major news publications around the world including BBC, ABC News, Forbes, etc.

As a musician 
Trippy began his music career in 2001 as a bassist for the Bradenton-based post-hardcore band, Funny Looking Kid. He took part in 2002 and 2003 Warped Tour with the band. Funny Looking Kid broke up in 2005.

In 2011, Trippy joined We the Kings as the bass player replacing Drew Thomsen who left the group earlier that year. He recorded his first studio album with the band, Somewhere Somehow, in 2013. The album debuted at no. 44 on the Billboard 200 and at no. 6 on the Top Rock Albums charts. In 2014 and 2015, Trippy recorded Stripped and Strange Love respectively, with We the Kings. Self Titled Nostalgia and Six were released in 2017 and 2018 respectively. Trippy has performed across the United States on the Vans Warped Tour as the bass player for We the Kings. As a member of the band, We the Kings, Trippy has received Platinum record by Australian Recording Industry Association. In 2016, he received Platinum certification from RIAA for "Check Yes Juliet". In 2017 and 2018, Trippy received Gold certifications for Strange Love and "Sad Song" from RIAA.

Personal life 
In March 2012 Trippy was diagnosed with a benign Oligodendroglioma brain tumor after having a seizure at the end of February. After the successful resection of the tumor, it recurred in September 2013 and was diagnosed as anaplastic oligodendroglioma brain cancer. In October 2013, Trippy started oral chemotherapy to combat the remaining 5% left after his second resection. In July 2020, he underwent a third brain surgery that removed 100% of the tumor. Trippy filmed and uploaded his brain surgeries on his YouTube channel. His videos received coverage from Salon.

Trippy married Allie Marie Wesenberg in 2017. The couple was profiled by PETA on May 2, 2018.

Awards and recognitions

References 

American bass guitarists
People from St. Petersburg, Florida
Guinness World Records
Ripley's Believe It or Not!

1984 births
Living people